Gita is a two-wheeled, follow-me, cargo-carrying robotic vehicle developed by Piaggio Fast Forward, a Boston area subsidiary of Piaggio.

Gita prototypes were first introduced in February 2017. The production model of the gita robot first became available for purchase on the United States market at the end of November of 2019. Two production models currently exist and are sold online at mygita.com.

Original device 
 The gita robot is a self-balancing two-wheeled robotic transporter that follows a human leader while observing pedestrian etiquette. 

The gita prototypes were cylinder-shaped with two rubber tread-like wheels at the outer edges. Each unit had a cargo bin enclosed between the wheels. Although capable of rolling at up to 22 miles per hour, which is fast enough to keep up with a runner or a bicyclist, the production models were subsequently limited to 6 miles per hour (an appropriate pace for walking and relaxed jogging). The Gita uses an array of cameras and sensors to navigate.

Latest version
Whereas the early prototypes made use of lidar, the production models rely instead on a computer vision solution that visually identifies the user and locks onto their body shape while scanning the surrounding environment. The gita operating system is being regularly updated with new behaviors that include small autonomous maneuvers and responses to the outdoor and indoor settings in which they are traveling. 

Two production models exist: gita and gita mini. Unlike the prototype, both self-balance by shifting the vehicle's weight forward and backward, with their wheels tucked into the vehicle's side (not on the outer edges). gita has the following capabilities: it can carry 40 lbs., has a 2630 cubic inch cargo bay (or roughly ~10 days worth of groceries for a single person), can stream music, is good for 4 hours of continuous travel (or about 12 miles), and fully recharges in 2 hours. gita mini has the following specifications: it can carry 20 lbs., has a 990 cubic inch cargo bay (roughly 5 days worth of groceries for a single person), is good for 7 hours of continuous travel (about 21 miles), and fully recharges in 2 hours. Both can operate fully in GPS-denied environments and without a wifi connection. They are exceedingly simple to operate: push the pairing button and off you go; then push the pairing button to park. A cell phone app permits more advanced functionalities.

Airport use 
Gita robots are being used by AtYourGate, a San Diego-based startup company, to deliver food within airports to passengers waiting at terminal gates.

Naming
The name for the mobile carrier comes from the Italian feminine noun, meaning "pleasure trip" or "short trip."

See also 

 Comparison of domestic robots
 Domestic robot

References 

Home appliance brands
2017 robots
Service robots
Piaggio Group
Products introduced in 2017